The Remixes II is the second remix album by Japanese duo Every Little Thing.  It was released on November 18, 1998, by Avex Trax. The album contains remixes of tracks from second album Time to Destination. 

A 4-vinyl edition of the album was released on June 16, 1999, including previously unreleased remixes that didn't make it to the original CD track listing.

Track listing 

The Remixes II Analog Set

Chart positions

References

Every Little Thing (band) albums
2002 remix albums